"Crash Your Party" is a song by pop-rap duo Karmin. It was written by the duo, with Heather Bright, Kelly Sheehan and Harr and Jackson, with the latter two serving as producers. By late 2011, the single got moderate responses from radio stations. The song was first promoted by radio on October 28, 2011, and was then available for digital download on October 30.

Background and conception
The single was written by Amy Heidemann, Nick Noonan, Heather Bright, Kelly Sheehan and Andrew Harr and Jermaine Jackson. The single was also produced by The Runners. The song is described as an "anthem for the people who want that one person in their lives to know that they're not always the center of attention as cited by the chorus' lyrics "You think you're the star of the show/But I'm about to let you know". "Crash Your Party" also contains a sample of the song "The Choice Is Yours (Revisited)" (1991) by alternative hip hop duo Black Sheep. It received moderate success, and charted #36 on the Billboard Pop Songs chart. The duo felt it was perfect choice for a first single by how they were introduced to the business through the fans, that they were "crashing the [music] industry's party".

Music video
The "Crash Your Party" music video was released on December 7, 2011 where it received about eight million views in its first month of release.

Credits and personnel
Vocals: Karmin
Songwriting: Amy Heidemann, Nick Noonan, Andrew Harr, Jermaine Jackson, Heather Bright, Kelly Sheehan, Andres Titus, William McLean, John Coltrane, Ridge Morton
Production: The Runners
Credits adapted from Hello album liner notes.

Chart performance

References 

Songs about parties
2011 singles
Karmin songs
Songs written by Kelly Sheehan
Songs written by Heather Bright
Songs written by Jermaine Jackson (hip hop producer)
Songs written by Andrew Harr
2011 songs
Sony Music singles
Epic Records singles
Compositions by John Coltrane